South Korean Footballer of the Year is an annual award from Korea Football Association. Official name is Korea Football Association Footballer of the Year

Men winners

Women winners

References 

Association football player of the year awards by nationality
KFA trophies and awards